Welch Hall may refer to:

Welch Hall (Eastern Michigan University), administration building on the Eastern Michigan University campus and listed under the National Register of Historic Places
Welch Hall (Missouri), a current fraternity house and former military academy in Columbia, Missouri
Welch Hall (University of Texas at Austin), a building on the campus at the University of Texas at Austin
Welch Hall (Yale), a freshman dormitory at Yale University in New Haven, Connecticut

Architectural disambiguation pages